Winthrop Rockefeller Lake is an impounded section of the Arkansas River, named for Governor Winthrop A. Rockefeller (1912–1973). It extends almost  along the river, from the Arthur V. Ormond Lock and Dam below Mile 177 near Morrilton, to the Dardanelle Lock and Dam above Mile 205 near Dardanelle. Lake Dardanelle (el. ) begins immediately above Rockefeller Lake.

The Arkansas River lakes have been popular with fishermen because of their large supply of catfish, white bass, bream, crappie, and other species of bass. Fishing is not the only reason for visitors, however; Petit Jean Mountain is close to the area and provides scenic views for visitors along the lake. The Ozark and Ouachita Mountains also offer great scenery and have mountain springs and recreation parks in abundance. The mountains of the Ozarks and Ouachitas are abundant in wildlife. The bald eagle often uses this area for wintering. Eagles can be seen here from late fall through early spring.

See also 
List of Arkansas dams and reservoirs

External links
 Lake Dardanelle and Winthrop Rockefeller Lake

Protected areas of Conway County, Arkansas
Protected areas of Pope County, Arkansas
Rockefeller
Protected areas of Yell County, Arkansas
Buildings and structures in Conway County, Arkansas
Buildings and structures in Pope County, Arkansas
Buildings and structures in Yell County, Arkansas
Dams in Arkansas
United States Army Corps of Engineers dams
Bodies of water of Conway County, Arkansas
Bodies of water of Pope County, Arkansas
Bodies of water of Yell County, Arkansas